The Lyndale Football & Netball Club, nicknamed Pumas, is an Australian rules football and netball club located in the Melbourne suburb of Noble Park. Lyndale currently plays in the Southern Football Netball League.

The club evolved out of the Lyndale Junior Football Club, whose history pre-dates the seniors by 25 years.

History
Lyndale commenced in the South East Suburban Football League in 1987, it struggled for 2 years in 2nd Division before the club transferred to the lower class East Suburban Churches Football Association and spent its first year in E grade. In 1990 E grade was abolished and the club spent the next three years in D Grade.

In 1993 the ESCFA merged with the Southern Football League. Lyndale was placed in 5th division. Improvement on the field allowed them to win the 1995 premiership. More improvement to the playing list allowed the club to take out the 1997 4th division and 2000 3rd divisions premierships.

After winning the 2000 division 3 premiership, the club made the 2001 2nd Division Grand Final only to lose to Ashwood. A regular finalist for the next couple of years, by 2005 the club began to struggle with the quality of the competition, accumulating in 2010, the seniors failed to win a game, finished last and got demoted back to Division 3. They have remained in that division to this day.

In 1993, the club went on an end of season trip to Tasmania, when a plane carrying 10 crashed as it attempted to land at Launceston Airport in poor weather six players were killed. The six players were Mark Baxter, Lance Baxter, Kevin Connor, Glenn King, Dean Prendegast and Scott Young.

Senior Premierships
  Southern Football League
 Division 3 (1): 2000
 Division 4 (1): 1997
 Division 5 (1): 1995

Netball Premiership div 3 2013

References

Australian rules football clubs in Melbourne
Southern Football League (Victoria)
Australian rules football clubs established in 1986
1986 establishments in Australia
Sport in the City of Greater Dandenong